is a Japanese professional sumo wrestler from Memuro, Hokkaido. He was an amateur champion at Chuo University and won the Amateur Yokozuna title at the All-Japan Sumo Championships in December 2016. He made his professional debut in May 2017, joining Oguruma stable. He reached the jūryō division in September 2017 and the top makuuchi division in January 2019. His highest rank has been maegashira 10.

Early life
He was born in Memuro, Kasai District, Hokkaido, the second of three children. This was also the hometown of yokozuna Ōnokuni. He started swimming from kindergarten, and also did judo. He began participating in local sumo tournaments from the fifth grade of elementary school. He was already  and  upon graduation from elementary school. At Memuro junior high he won the Hokkaido Junior High School Championships three years running, he suffered major cruciate ligament injuries in his knee, and was praised by the director of his high school sumo club for working hard at rehabilitation from the injury without complaining. He enrolled at Saitama Sakae High School, known for its prowess in sumo with ōzeki Gōeidō among its alumni. He left his parents house at this time and lived in a dormitory with other students. After graduating from high school he entered the law department of Chuo University and was the captain of the sumo club by his fourth year. He finished in the top 8 at the National Student Sumo Championships, and in 2016 won the Amateur Yokozuna title, the first from Chuo University to achieve this since Kurimoto in 1990.

Career
Because of his amateur achievements, Yago was allowed to enter professional sumo in the third highest makushita division, leap-frogging the lower divisions. He joined Oguruma stable, recruited by the former ōzeki Kotokaze. He made his debut in May 2017 at the rank of makushita tsukedashi 15, and earned a 5–2 record. In his next tournament he won the makushita divisional championship or yūshō with  a perfect 7–0 record, which guaranteed him promotion to the second highest jūryō division and elite sekitori status. Two losing records of seven wins against eight losses saw him drop back down to makushita in January 2018, but he made an immediate return to jūryō with a 5–2 score. He progressed steadily up the jūryō division in 2018, recording four consecutive winning records, and entered the top makuuchi division in January 2019. He scored nine wins against six losses in his top division debut, which saw him promoted to his highest rank to date of maegashira 10 for the March 2019 tournament. However, three straight losing records saw him demoted to jūryō for the September 2019 tournament. He managed an 8–7 record in September, but then three straight scores of only four wins against eleven losses saw him demoted to the makushita division for the (cancelled) Natsu tournament in May 2020. Following the cancellation, he had surgery on his knees. He returned to jūryō for the January 2021 tournament, scoring eight wins and seven losses, but he was only able to obtain four wins in the March tournament and was demoted to makushita for the May 2021 tournament. A 4–3 record in May was enough to return him immediately to jūryō.

Fighting style
Yago is a yotsu-sumo wrestler, who prefers fighting on the mawashi to pushing or thrusting at his opponents. His favourite grip is hidari-yotsu, a right hand outside and left hand inside position. His most common winning kimarite is a straightforward yori-kiri or force out.

Career record

See also
List of active sumo wrestlers

References

External links

1994 births
Living people
Japanese sumo wrestlers
Sumo people from Hokkaido
Sumo wrestlers who use their birth name